Ralf Schumacher (born 30 June 1975) is a German former racing driver. He is the younger brother of seven-time Formula One World Champion Michael Schumacher, and the pair are the only siblings to each win Formula One races.

Schumacher began karting at the age of three and achieved early success before making the transition to automobile racing in the German Formula Three Championship and the Formula Nippon series. He first drove in Formula One with Jordan Grand Prix for the 1997 season. Schumacher moved to the Williams team in 1999, finishing sixth in the Drivers' Championship that year. He won his first Grand Prix in 2001, en route to fourth place in the Drivers' Championship, and subsequently won five more races over the course of two years.

Schumacher left Williams at the end of 2004 and joined Toyota Racing in 2005. However, his performance throughout 2006 and 2007 resulted in Schumacher leaving Formula One, as a result of internal pressure. After leaving Formula One, Schumacher joined the Deutsche Tourenwagen Masters in 2008, achieving minor success, and retired from motorsport at the end of 2012 to enter a managerial role within DTM, mentoring young drivers. He is now a co-commentator for Sky Sport in Germany.

Early life and career
Schumacher was born in Hürth, North Rhine-Westphalia, West Germany on 30 June 1975, the second son of Rolf Schumacher, a bricklayer, and his wife Elisabeth. He has one elder brother, Michael. Schumacher began karting at the age of three driving on his parents' go-kart track in Kerpen. His first major karting success came when he clinched the NRW Cup and the Gold Cup in 1991. In 1992 he won the German Junior Kart Championship. He then moved up into the senior series, finishing runner-up.

Aged 17 Schumacher moved into car racing, finishing runner-up in the ADAC Junior Formula Championship. This performance allowed Schumacher to test a Formula Three car during 1992, and later took part in a Formula Three event. His testing and one-off appearance in the series caught the attention of WTS Racing allowing Schumacher to enter the German Formula Three Championship in 1994, where he finished third. He finished fourth and thirtieth in the Macau Grand Prix and the Masters of Formula 3, respectively.

His performances in 1995 had improved over the previous year: Schumacher secured pole position and victory in the Macau Grand Prix and finished second in the Masters of Formula 3. In the German Formula Three series, Schumacher took three victories and finished second in the Championship behind Norberto Fontana.

For 1996, Schumacher's manager Willi Weber secured him a seat in the Formula Nippon Series, driving for the Team Le Mans alongside experienced driver Naoki Hattori. Schumacher won the series on his first attempt, becoming the first rookie driver to clinch the championship. In the same year, Schumacher and Hattori entered the All Japan Grand Touring Car Championship, winning four races and taking the runner-up spot in the GT500 Championship behind the pairing of David Brabham and John Nielsen.

Formula One career

Jordan (1997–1998)

1997
In August 1996, Schumacher tested for the McLaren team at Silverstone. In September, it was announced that Schumacher had signed a three-year contract to drive for the Jordan team. The deal also brought in a further £8 million from Schumacher's sponsor Bitburger brewery, with a small percentage going towards his salary. In January 1997, Giancarlo Fisichella was confirmed as Schumacher's teammate replacing Martin Brundle, who expressed a desire to remain with the team. Schumacher believed that Brundle's experience would have helped him in the coming season.

Schumacher's season started off with consecutive retirements in the opening two rounds in Australia and Brazil. He picked up the first podium of his career in Argentina with third place despite a collision with teammate Fisichella. Further consecutive retirements followed in the next four races before picking up a sixth-place finish in France. Schumacher followed this result by picking up consecutive fifth-place finishes in the following three races. A further two retirements followed in the races in Belgium and Italy, before picking up a fifth-place finish in Austria. Schumacher did not score points in the final three races of the season, which included retirements in the Luxembourg Grand Prix and the European Grand Prix. Schumacher, in his début season, finished 11th in the Drivers' Championship, scoring 13 points. Like all male German citizens, Schumacher was subject to compulsory military service in the German Armed Forces.

Outside Formula One, Schumacher participated in the FIA GT Championship as a guest driver for the AMG Mercedes team at the Spa 4 Hours and was partnered by Klaus Ludwig. The pair finished fifth, scoring two points.

1998
For 1998, Schumacher remained at Jordan and was partnered by 1996 Drivers' Champion Damon Hill. Schumacher endured a horrid start: He suffered from retirements in the first three races, and managed to finish in the races in San Marino and Spain, albeit outside the points scoring positions. Schumacher suffered from further consecutive retirements in the next two races, and managed to finish 16th in France. He managed to secure his and Jordan's first point of the season with a sixth-place finish at the British Grand Prix, before picking up further consecutive points finishes in the next two races.

Schumacher did not score points in Hungary, but managed to secure second place in Belgium behind teammate Hill. Schumacher was issued with team orders to prevent him from overtaking Hill, which caused a strain in the relationship between Schumacher and Jordan. Schumacher managed to take his second consecutive podium with third place in Italy. After this race, it was announced that Schumacher signed a two-year contract to drive for the Williams team, alongside Alessandro Zanardi. Reportedly this came after Michael verbally declared to Eddie Jordan that Ralf would never race for his team again and offering to buy Ralf out of his contract with the team. According to Jordan himself 22 years later, Michael actually paid the money of 2 million GBP to terminate Ralf's contract. He finished the season with consecutive retirements in the final two races. Schumacher clinched 10th place in the Drivers' Championship, with 14 points.

Williams (1999–2004)

1999

Schumacher began his season by finishing third in Australia, which was followed up with a fourth-place finish in Brazil. However, he suffered consecutive retirements in the next two races—he spun off in San Marino, and suffered an accident in Monaco. Schumacher was able to take further points in the next two races in Spain, Canada and France. Schumacher took a further podium position with third place in Britain, but retired from the next race in Austria due to a spin. He took further points in the German Grand Prix, before taking a ninth-place finish in Hungary.

In Belgium, Schumacher took fifth place helped by a one-stop strategy earning him a better finish. In October, it was announced that Schumacher's contract was extended to a three-year deal worth $31 million. He rounded off the season with a fifth-place finish in Japan. Schumacher finished the season sixth in the Drivers' Championship, with 35 points.

2000
Schumacher continued to drive for Williams in 2000, and was partnered by rookie driver and future World Champion  Jenson Button. His season started well: He managed to take third place in the opening race in Australia, and clinched fifth position in Brazil. He was forced to retire from the San Marino Grand Prix due to a fuel system issue, but managed to clinch consecutive fourth-place finishes in the next two races. However, Schumacher was forced into another retirement as he was caught in a collision involving Eddie Irvine and Jos Verstappen at the European Grand Prix, and another retirement followed in Monaco due to a crash where he suffered from a 3-inch cut across his calf.

He was passed fit to participate in the Canadian Grand Prix, where he was classified 14th after being hit in the closing stages by BAR driver Jacques Villeneuve. Schumacher managed to take fifth place in France, before suffering a brake failure that forced him to retire in Austria. He managed to finish the next four races, which included consecutive third-place finishes in Belgium and Italy. However, despite these results, he was unable to finish the final three races of the season. Schumacher finished fifth in the Drivers' Championship, with 24 points.

2001

At the opening round in Australia, Schumacher retired after a collision with BAR driver Jacques Villeneuve which resulted in the death of race marshal Graham Beveridge. He scored his first points of the season with a fifth-place finish in Malaysia, and later spun off in the next race in Brazil which included a collision with Barrichello early in the race. In the succeeding round at the San Marino Grand Prix, Schumacher started from third on the grid and led every lap of the race to take his first Formula One victory. However, the following three races saw Schumacher failing to finish.

Schumacher won his second career victory in Canadian Grand Prix, with brother Michael finishing second and the result marked the first one-two finish by siblings. These results were followed by a fourth-place finish at the European Grand Prix, and took second place in France. He was unable to finish the race in Britain due to a problem with his car's engine. In Germany, Schumacher took his third and final win of the season having started from second on the grid. This result marked a good run of form as Schumacher scored points in three of the remaining five races, including a third-place finish in Italy. Schumacher finished the season fourth in the Drivers' Championship, with 49 points.

2002

For 2002, Schumacher announced of his intention to wear glasses over the coming season to improve his vision. His decision was influenced after he was involved in a car crash on the Autobahn 3 when driving to visit his family. On 14 January, the Fédération Internationale de l'Automobile (FIA), Formula One's governing body gave permission for Schumacher to wear glasses, and his helmet maker Schuberth developed padding with channels for the glass frames.

His season started in Australia with a first lap accident where his car was launched into the air after colliding with Ferrari driver Rubens Barrichello. In the following race in Malaysia, Schumacher took his only victory of the season. He followed up the result by taking consecutive podiums in the next two races—a second place in Brazil, and a third-place finish in San Marino. At the Spanish Grand Prix, Schumacher ran wide on lap 29 while under pressure from teammate Montoya and eventually retired from an engine failure, although he was classified 11th. He managed to secure consecutive points finishes in the next two races with a podium in Monaco. He followed these results by finishing in next eight races, which includes consecutive third-place finishes in Germany and Hungary. Schumacher rounded off the year with non-points finishes in the final three rounds which included a retirement in the United States. For the second consecutive season, Schumacher finished fourth in the Drivers' Championship, with 42 points.

2003

In 2003, Schumacher again competed with Williams alongside Montoya. He was unable to take part in winter testing in January, prior to the season because of reoccurring back pains, although he later returned in February. He endured a good first half of the season: Schumacher scored points in the opening seven races, and clinched his first podium of the season with second place in Canada. Schumacher backed up the results by taking consecutive victories in the European Grand Prix and the French Grand Prix. He managed to finish in ninth place in Britain. At the German Grand Prix, Schumacher retired on the first lap of the race after a collision with Rubens Barrichello and Kimi Räikkönen, for which he received a 10 place grid penalty for the next race. Williams successfully appealed against the decision and Schumacher managed to qualify second for the Hungarian Grand Prix, where he finished fourth.

At a test held at the Autodromo Nazionale Monza, Schumacher suffered a high-speed accident where he sustained a concussion. He was taken for a precautionary check at the circuit's medical centre before he was transferred to San Rafaele hospital. Although he had participated in the event's first qualifying session, Schumacher decided to withdraw and his place was taken by Williams test driver Marc Gené. He returned for the United States Grand Prix where he retired having suffered an accident resulting from his car sliding on a wet track surface. At the season finale in Japan, Schumacher finished 12th despite spinning his car three times. He finished the season fifth in the Drivers' Championship, with 58 points, and helped Williams clinch second in the Constructors' Championship.

2004

Schumacher remained at Williams for 2004 and continued to be partnered by Montoya. Schumacher was ambitious for the season, saying: "I can say that we'll come up with a car that will be competitive from the very first race of the new season". He made a good start to his season by finishing fourth in the opening round in Australia, although he retired from the next race in Malaysia from an engine failure. He managed to secure consecutive seventh-place finishes in the next two rounds, before finishing outside the points in Monaco. Schumacher was forced into retirement on the opening lap of the European Grand Prix due to a collision. At the Canadian Grand Prix, Schumacher qualified on pole position and went on to finish second in the race, but was later disqualified for irregularities on his car's brake ducts.

At the United States Grand Prix, Schumacher suffered serious injuries in an accident that occurred on the ninth lap of the race. The deceleration was measured at 78 g (765 m/s²), resulting in a concussion as well as two minor fractures to his spinal column. Schumacher was forced to miss the next six races. Williams driver Marc Gené substituted for Schumacher for the races in France and Britain, with Antônio Pizzonia taking over the role for the next four races. In July, Schumacher signed a three-year contract with the Toyota team. He was passed fit for the Italian Grand Prix, but ultimately returned for the Chinese Grand Prix, where he retired from a puncture. Schumacher followed up the result by taking second place in Japan, and a fifth place at the final round in Brazil. He finished the season ninth in the Drivers' Championship, with 24 points.

Toyota (2005–2007)

2005

For 2005, Schumacher was partnered by Jarno Trulli at Toyota and was hopeful about his prospects for the upcoming season. Schumacher finished 12th in the opening round in Australia, and secured his first points of the season in Malaysia. He managed to secure a consecutive points finish in Bahrain, and later finished outside the points in San Marino, due to taking a 25-second penalty after finishing eighth due to causing an incident in his pitstops. Schumacher followed this up with consecutive points finishes in the next two races. He retired due to a spin during the European Grand Prix.

During the second practice session of the United States Grand Prix, Schumacher lost control of his car entering the final corner of the circuit, which resulted from a tyre failure. He was forced to miss the event and was replaced by Toyota test driver Ricardo Zonta. Schumacher returned for the French Grand Prix and took a seventh-place finish, which he followed up with three more consecutive points scoring positions which included a podium finish in Hungary, and later finished outside the points in Turkey. This marked a turning point as Schumacher scored in all of the remaining races and took a podium position in the season finale in China. He finished the season sixth place in the Drivers' Championship, and helped Toyota clinch fourth in the Constructors' Championship.

2006

Schumacher continued at Toyota and was again partnered by Trulli for 2006. He was ambitious for the upcoming season: saying, "We're looking to win some races. That's what our target should be and let's hope it's a realistic one". He started the season with a non-points finish in Bahrain as both Toyota cars were off the pace, but managed to score his and Toyota's first points of the season with eighth place in Malaysia. He managed to secure his and Toyota's only podium finish of the season in Australia.

Schumacher took ninth place in San Marino, but suffered consecutive retirements in the next three races. However, he was able to finish the next five consecutive races, which included points scoring positions in France, Hungary and Turkey. He was unable to finish the races in China and Brazil, due to problems with his car's oil pressure and suspension respectively. On 29 September, Schumacher was elected as the chairman of the Grand Prix Drivers Association (GPDA), the trade union of Formula One drivers. He finished the season tenth in the Drivers' Championship, and scored 20 points.

2007

Schumacher remained at Toyota and continued to be partnered by Trulli for 2007. Despite Toyota's performances during 2006, Schumacher was optimistic for the upcoming season. Schumacher took eighth position at the opening round in Australia, and finished outside the points-scoring positions in the next two rounds. At the Spanish Grand Prix, he was involved in a collision with Williams driver Alexander Wurz and eventually retired with a mechanical issue. After finishing 16th at the Monaco Grand Prix, it was reported that Toyota were unhappy with his performances and faced pressure of possibly being replaced before the season concluded. Despite taking eighth place in Canada, Toyota Motorsport vice-chairman Tadashi Yamashina publicly urged Schumacher to improve his performances, as he qualified 18th for the race.

At the next Grand Prix in the United States, Schumacher spun off in the first corner and collided with the cars of David Coulthard and Rubens Barrichello. To ensure a greater chance of retaining his seat at Toyota, he offered to accept a $17 million pay cut. Schumacher did not finish the races at the British Grand Prix, and the European Grand Prix from a mechanical failure and a collision with BMW Sauber driver Nick Heidfeld respectively. Schumacher later scored a further point for Toyota in Hungary, before taking consecutive finishes outside the points in the next three races. He was unable to finish the race in Japan having sustained a puncture. On 1 October, it was announced by Schumacher that he would leave Toyota at the end of the season. Schumacher spun off in the next race in China and secured an 11th-place finish in the season finale in Brazil. Schumacher ended his final season in Formula One 16th in the Drivers' Championship, with 5 points.

Attempted comebacks
Before and after Schumacher's departure from Toyota, he was linked to several teams in Formula One. He held talks with long-time mentor and Toro Rosso team principal Franz Tost about a possible drive for the team, who ultimately opted to sign Sebastian Vettel and Sébastien Bourdais. Schumacher later approached McLaren to enquire about a seat that was vacated by Fernando Alonso, but was later turned down. Despite these setbacks, Schumacher remained certain that a Formula One seat would be available for 2008.

Schumacher's final participation in Formula One came at a test held for the newly formed Force India team in December 2007. This was a bid to secure a race seat alongside fellow German Adrian Sutil. During the test, Schumacher was the slowest driver, and later announced that he would not join the team for 2008, and that the possibility of participating in Formula One would be unlikely.

After spending two seasons away from the sport, Schumacher's experience made him a target for the new teams US F1, Hispania (HRT), Virgin and Lotus that entered the 2010 season, all of whom he rejected.

Deutsche Tourenwagen Masters (2008–2012)

2008

On 18 February 2008, it was announced that Schumacher would be driving in the Deutsche Tourenwagen Masters (DTM) series in 2008, driving for Mücke Motorsport and was partnered by Maro Engel. Making his début at the Hockenheimring, Schumacher managed to finish 14th, which he followed up with a 10th-place finish at Oschersleben. He was forced into retirement at the next race at Lausitz, and managed to finish in the next three races he entered, albeit outside the points scoring positions. He secured his first points in the DTM series by finishing eighth at the Nürburgring.

He secured 15th place at the round held at Brands Hatch, before he backed the result up with a seventh-place finish at the Circuit de Catalunya. Schumacher rounded off the season with a retirement at the Bugatti Circuit and a 14th-place finish at the Hockenheimring. He finished the season 14th in the Drivers' Championship, with 3 points.

2009

For 2009, it was announced that Schumacher had extended his contract to drive for Mercedes-Benz, and would move to the HWA Team, and was partnered by Paul di Resta, Bruno Spengler and Gary Paffett. Schumacher managed to finish the first two races, although he did not finish in the points scoring positions. He secured his first points of the season with a sixth-place finish at the Norisring, which he followed up with 10th and 11th-place finishes in the races at Zandvoort and Oschersleben respectively.

He managed to secure his second point scoring position with a seventh place at the Nürburgring, and followed the result up by clinching consecutive finishes in the next two rounds at Brands Hatch and the Circuit de Catalunya. Schumacher took further points with a fifth-place finish at Dijon-Prenois and finished the season with a multi-car collision at the Hockenheimring. Schumacher finished the season 11th in the Drivers' Championship, and scored 9 points.

2010

On 23 March 2010, it was announced that Schumacher would be retained by HWA for 2010, and would be partnered by di Resta, Spengler and Gary Paffett. Schumacher's season started with a ninth-place finish at the Hockenheimring, before he was forced into retirement due to a failure in his car's electronic control in Valencia resulting in an misfire. Schumacher later secured finishes in the next two rounds, which he backed up with his first points of the season with sixth place at the Nürburgring.

However, this marked a turning point as Schumacher did not score points in the remaining six races. He suffered retirements in the races at Brands Hatch where he was involved in a collision and later suffered damage to his steering, as a result of running off the race track His final retirement of 2010 came at the Hockenheimring where he was involved in another first lap collision. Schumacher finished the season 14th in the Drivers' Championship, scoring 3 points.

2011

On 6 April 2011, it was confirmed that Schumacher would remain at HWA for 2011 and was partnered by Paffett, Spengler and Jamie Green. Schumacher started off the season by taking his first podium in DTM with third place at the Hockenheimring. However, Schumacher was unable to capitalize on his result as he finished outside the point scoring positions at the next race held at Zandvoort. He later secured his second podium of the season with a second-place finish at the Red Bull Ring, which remained his best result in DTM. Schumacher was unable to take further points in Lausitz, but managed to clinch sixth place in Norisring.

Despite the early successes of Schumacher in the first part of the season, he was able to only secure one further point scoring finish at Brands Hatch and suffered retirements at the races held at the Nürburgring, where he collided with Mücke driver David Coulthard and received a suspended penalty, and Oscherleben, from a collision with Audi driver Filipe Albuquerque. Schumacher managed to finish the races in Valencia and at the Hockenheimring, albeit outside the point scoring positions. Schumacher finished the season eighth in the Drivers' Championship, scoring 21 points.

2012
On 20 October 2011, it was announced that Schumacher would remain at HWA for the 2012 season, and was once again partnered by Green and Paffett who were joined by new signing Christian Vietoris. Schumacher's season got off well: he clinched consecutive points scoring finishes in the first two races of the season, and managed to secure further finishes in the races held at Brands Hatch and the Red Bull Ring, although Schumacher did not finish in the points scoring positions. He was forced into retirement at the next race held at the Norisring due to an electrical failure while leading.

However, this marked a turning point in Schumacher's season as he managed to finish the remaining five races of the season. He managed to secure points finishes in the races held at Zandvoort and the season finale at the Hockenheimring. He also managed to finish the races held at Oschersleben and in Valencia, although he secured no points. Schumacher finished the season 17th in the Drivers' Championship, with 10 points.

Driver management
Schumacher announced his retirement from active motorsport in March 2013 and would enter a management role at Mücke Motorsport, as well as becoming a shareholder in the team. In his role, he assists in the mentoring of young drivers signed with Mercedes-Benz.

Personal life
In April 2001, Schumacher became engaged to Cora-Caroline Brinkmann, a former model; they were married on 5 October that year, in a private civil ceremony at the couple's home in Hallwang, Austria. On 23 October 2001 their son David was born, three weeks premature. David is also a racing driver. Outside motorsport, Schumacher enjoys cycling, tennis and backgammon.

On 20 February 2015 Schumacher's lawyer confirmed that Schumacher and his wife had divorced after an acrimonious period of separation. The couple fought a custody battle over their son, and Schumacher's estimated €100 million fortune, which was resolved with Cora receiving a €6 million settlement and the family home at Bergheim. Schumacher was appointed a Laureus Ambassador at the Laureus World Sports Awards for the Laureus Foundation in 2011.

Animal rights 
Schumacher is a prominent supporter of the Gut Aiderbichl animal sanctuary, situated near Salzburg. However, animal rights activists have accused Schumacher of hypocrisy as he was known as a passionate hunter in his spare time. People for the Ethical Treatment of Animals (PETA) criticized Schumacher as he was accused of paying £35,000 to shoot three deer in a defined area in 2007.

Racing record

Career summary

Complete Formula Nippon results
(key) (Races in bold indicate pole position; races in italics indicate fastest lap)

Complete Formula One results
(key) (Races in bold indicate pole position; races in italics indicate fastest lap)

† Did not finish, but was classified as he had completed more than 90% of the race distance.

Complete DTM results
(key) (Races in bold indicate pole position) (Races in italics indicate fastest lap)

References

External links

 
 
 

1975 births
Living people
People from Hürth
Sportspeople from Cologne (region)
Racing drivers from North Rhine-Westphalia
German racing drivers
German Formula One drivers
Jordan Formula One drivers
Williams Formula One drivers
Toyota Formula One drivers
Formula One race winners
Deutsche Tourenwagen Masters drivers
Formula Nippon drivers
German Formula Three Championship drivers
Ralf
HWA Team drivers
Mücke Motorsport drivers
Mercedes-AMG Motorsport drivers
Team LeMans drivers